Friday Night Live may refer to:

 Friday Night Live (Big Brother Australia), a television series aired on Network Ten as a part of Big Brother Australia
 Friday Night Live (UK TV show), successor to Saturday Live
 Friday Live, originally titled Friday Night Live, a news commentary program which aired on Sky News Australia

See also
 Friday Night Games, spin-off series of Big Brother Australia